Wyrms Footprints, Glorantha Legends and Lore, is a 1995 book, written by Greg Stafford, with a cover by Dan Barker, and published by Chaosium and Reaching Moon Megacorp. It expands Stafford's fantasy world of Glorantha.

Contents
Wyrms Footprints reprints articles that appeared in the bi-monthly Wyrm's Footnotes magazine, collected together for the first time.

Reception
Paul Pettengale reviewed Wyrms Footprints for Arcane magazine, rating it an 8 out of 10 overall. Pettengale comments that "This collection [...] helps any GM embellish his or her Gloranthan setting. While the staggering variety of content may give the impression that chaos rather than order has predominated in the compilation of the supplement, this doesn't detract from the book's utility."

Reviews
Dragon #225

References

Chaosium books
Role-playing game supplements introduced in 1995
RuneQuest supplements